Daniel F. Keenan (born February 15, 1961 in Holyoke, Massachusetts) is an American politician who represented the Third Hampden District in the Massachusetts House of Representatives from 1995–2007.  He is now the Vice President of Government Relations for Trinity Health Of New England in Springfield, Massachusetts and Hartford, Connecticut.  He resides in Southwick, Massachusetts.

References

1961 births
Living people
Saint Anselm College alumni
Western New England University alumni
Politicians from Holyoke, Massachusetts
Democratic Party members of the Massachusetts House of Representatives
People from Southwick, Massachusetts